is an extreme trans-Neptunian object from the extended scattered disc in the outermost region of the Solar System, approximately  in diameter. It was first observed on 3 September 2005, by astronomers with the Canada–France Ecliptic Plane Survey using the Canada–France–Hawaii Telescope at the Mauna Kea Observatories in Hawaii, United States.

The detached, extended scattered disc object (ESDO) is on a highly eccentric orbit and belongs to the extreme trans-Neptunian objects.

Orbit and classification 

 belongs to a small group of detached objects with perihelion distances of 30 AU or more, and semi-major axes of 150 AU or more. Such extreme trans-Neptunian objects (ETNOs) can not reach such orbits without some perturbing object, which lead to the speculation of Planet Nine.

It orbits the Sun at a distance of 39–270 AU once every 1923 years and 10 months (702,689 days; semi-major axis of 154.68 AU). Its orbit has an eccentricity of 0.75 and an inclination of 20° with respect to the ecliptic. The body's observation arc begins with its first official observation at Mauna Kea in September 2005.

Numbering and naming 

As of 2018, this minor planet has neither been numbered nor named by the Minor Planet Center. The official discoverer(s) will be defined when the object is numbered.

Physical characteristics 

According to the Johnston's archive and to American astronomer Michael Brown,  measures 128 and 130 kilometers in diameter based on an assumed albedo of 0.09 and 0.08, respectively. Due to its small size, it is listed as "probably not" a dwarf planet (100–200 km) on Michael Brown's website, which uses a 5-class taxonomic system that ranges from "nearly certainly" to "possibly" for potential dwarf planet candidates. As of 2018, no rotational lightcurve has been obtained from photometric observations. The body's rotation period, pole and shape remain unknown.

See also

References

External links 
 
 

Minor planet object articles (unnumbered)

20050903